Grassy Knoll may refer to:

A knoll with a considerable amount of grass growing on it.
Grassy knoll, a small hill on Dealey Plaza, Dallas, USA
The Grassy Knoll (band), an American instrumental music group
Grassy Knoll (album), an album by New Zealand band The Exponents
Tal's Hill, a former hill known as the Grassy Knoll